Theodore Leslie Futch (January 19, 1895 – January 18, 1992) was a United States Army officer with the rank of brigadier general. He spent his whole army career in the Field Artillery Branch.

Early life

Theodore Leslie Futch was born on January 19, 1895, in Monroe, North Carolina. He attended the United States Military Academy at West Point, New York and graduated there on August 30, 1917. He was also commissioned Second Lieutenant of Field Artillery on the same date.
Many of his West Point classmates later became general officers during World War II. For example: J. Lawton Collins, Mark W. Clark, Daniel Noce, Ernest N. Harmon, Laurence B. Keiser, Milton B. Halsey, Charles H. Gerhardt, William K. Harrison, Jr., Robert W. Hasbrouck, Bryant Moore, Harris M. Melasky, William W. Eagles, Norman Schwarzkopf, Sr., Miles A. Cowles, Henry A. Barber, Jr., Theodore E. Buechler, John T. Cole, Harold A. Nisley, Horace Harding, Charles S. Kilburn, George H. Weems or William O. Reeder.

Futch served in France during World War I and was appointed an aide de camp to Brigadier General Harry G. Bishop, who served as commander of the 3rd Artillery Brigade. He served in this capacity until 1919, when he was transferred back to the States, where he was appointed a professor of military science and tactics at Iowa State College.

In 1926, Futch attended the Battery Officer's Course at United States Army Field Artillery School at Fort Sill, Oklahoma. Subsequently, served there as an instructor until 1930.

While serving as a captain with the 13th Field Artillery Regiment at Oahu, Hawaii, he saved a life from drowning of Private First Class Alexander J. Kaye of the Service Battery. For this action, Futch was awarded with the Soldier's Medal.
 
In 1935, Futch graduated from the Command and General Staff School at Fort Leavenworth in Kansas. Then he served as a professor of military science and tactics at Alabama Polytechnic Institute until 1939.

World War II

During the year of 1939, Futch was transferred back to Hawaii, where he served with the 11th Field Artillery Brigade. In 1940, Futch was appointed commanding officer of the 3rd Battalion, 18th Field Artillery Regiment. His next service assignment was back at Fort Sill in Oklahoma, where he was appointed executive officer of the Field Artillery School. In 1942, he was appointed an assistant commander of the Field Artillery School.

In December 1942, Futch was transferred to the XIII Corps under command of Major General Emil F. Reinhardt, where he was appointed the corps' artillery commander. He spent his time with the corps in the states, and in November 1943, he was promoted to the rank of brigadier general.

In 1944, he was transferred to the 35th Infantry Division under the command of Major General Paul W. Baade as its artillery commander. Then, he was sent to the European Theater. With 35th Division, Futch participated in many battles of World War II, including in France, Luxembourg, the Netherlands, Belgium and Germany. Futch stayed with the 35th Division until September 1945, where the Division returned to the states. For his service with the 35th Infantry Division during the war, Futch was awarded with the Legion of Merit, four Bronze Star Medals and multiple foreign decorations.

Postwar life

On September 25, 1945, Futch was appointed the commanding general of Fort Bragg in North Carolina and stayed in this capacity until the beginning of January 1946. Futch then served as executive officer of the Civilian Components at Fort McPherson, Georgia, before he was transferred to The Citadel, where he was a Professor of Military Science & Tactics until 1950.

His last military assignment was as commanding general of the Fort Indiantown Gap in Pennsylvania, where he retired on August 31, 1954.

Following his retirement, he served as the commandant of cadets at Lyman Ward Military Academy in Camp Hill, Alabama, from 1959 through 1967.

Personal life

Futch married three times: He married his second wife in 1925 to Ida Reid Calhoun, with whom he had a daughter, Ida. They divorced in 1929, but Futch married again in 1931 to Margaret McLean Chase and had a son, David, and two daughters, Ellen and Katherine.

Decorations

Here is Brigadier General Futch's ribbon bar:

References

1895 births
1992 deaths
United States Army Field Artillery Branch personnel
People from Monroe, North Carolina
Military personnel from North Carolina
United States Military Academy alumni
United States Army Command and General Staff College alumni
Burials at Arlington National Cemetery
United States Army personnel of World War I
Recipients of the Legion of Merit
Recipients of the Soldier's Medal
Recipients of the Legion of Honour
Recipients of the Croix de Guerre 1939–1945 (France)
United States Army generals of World War II
United States Army generals
Auburn University faculty
Iowa State University faculty